Gromphadorhina is one of several roach genera in the tribe Gromphadorhini, all from the island of Madagascar. It is one of several genera known collectively known as hissing cockroaches, and common in the pet trade. In the older literature, the name is sometimes misspelled as "Gromphadorrhina”

As pets
All four Gromphadorhina species are widely kept as exotic pets, where the most well-known species is the Madagascar hissing cockroach, (G. portentosa), though this is debatable as at least two other species in the genus are commonly confused with it; G. oblongonota and G. picea.

References

Cockroach genera
Endemic fauna of Madagascar